Japanese-Ukrainian relations are formal diplomatic relations between Japan and Ukraine. Japan extended diplomatic recognition to the Ukrainian state on December 28, 1991, immediately after the breakup of the Soviet Union and full diplomatic relations were established on January 26, 1992.

Ukraine has an embassy in Tokyo, and Japan has an embassy in Kyiv.

Trade and economy 
From the beginning of 2008, Ukrainian-Japanese relations have improved significantly, with regular exchanges between the two countries sponsored by groups such as InvestUkraine, the Ukrainian-Japanese center and the Japan External Trade Organization. On March 25, 2009, Yulia Tymoshenko, Prime Minister of Ukraine, visited Japan and met with Taro Aso, Prime Minister of Japan. In a joint statement, they welcomed cooperation in trade, investment and energy conservation, and discussed the effect of the recent economic crisis among other topics.

The balance of trade between Ukraine and Japan is heavily weighed in favor of Ukraine, with Japan exporting steel pipe and automobiles and importing aluminum and food products. In a different form of trade, on July 15, 2008 Japan, a signatory to the Kyoto Protocol, agreed to buy greenhouse-gas emission allowances from Ukraine to reach a target set under the U.N. climate-change treaty. The deal was finalized on March 26, 2009

Japan also has assisted Ukrainian educational and cultural institutions financially in the amount of more than US$4.3 million in the 1998 till 2009 period. Moreover, Japan provided Ukraine with grants of more than $151.8 million.

Japan's support for the integrity and sovereignty of Ukraine 
Japan has reflected that they are a staunch ally to Ukraine in the midst of the 2014 Crimean Crisis. The Japanese government placed sanctions on Russia, although it has been noted that the sanctions were designed in a way to have no real effect and that the Japanese government did not want to jeopardize its relations with Russia. Tokyo criticized Russia, saying that Russia is violating the territorial integrity and sovereignty of Ukraine. In addition, the Japanese government has stated that they are willing to provide Ukraine with US$1.5 billion in financial aid when Kyiv agrees to accept and enact various IMF reforms.

In February 2022, after the Russian invasion of Ukraine, Japan imposed sanctions on Russia which prohibited the issuance of Russian bonds in Japan, froze the assets of certain Russian individuals, and restricted travel to Japan. Ukrainian President Volodymyr Zelenskyy praised Japan as the "first Asian nation that has begun exerting pressure on Russia." 

On 20 March 2022,  Japanese Prime Minister Fumio Kishida and his Cambodian counterpart, Hun Sen, urged Russia to halt the war in Ukraine immediately and remove its forces, calling the aggression "a grave breach of the United Nations Charter."

Cooperation against nuclear disasters in Chernobyl and Fukushima 
President Viktor Yushchenko visited in July 2005, where he discussed among other things the Chernobyl clean-up program.

On October 30, 2011, the Japanese government raised the number of workers at the Japanese embassy in Kyiv from 30 to 36, in order to learn more about how Ukraine was dealing with the Chernobyl Nuclear Disaster, as Japan is still in the wake of the Fukushima Daiichi nuclear disaster.

High level visits 
Ukrainian President Leonid Kuchma made a state visit to Japan in March 1995. President Viktor Yushchenko subsequently visited in July 2005.

See also
Foreign relations of Japan
Foreign relations of Ukraine

References

External links
 Embassy of Japan in Ukraine
 Embassy of Ukraine in Japan
 Japanese Ministry of Foreign Affairs in relations with Ukraine

 
Ukraine
Bilateral relations of Ukraine